Yakeshi ( Yagshi qot, Mongolian Cyrillic: Ягши хот) is a county-level city of Hulunbuir, Inner Mongolia, People's Republic of China.

The city's economy is based on forestry industry, wood products, traditional Chinese medicines, gold, coal, iron, copper, wheat, rapeseed farming, sheep raising and dairy industries.

In 2008 several major players in the automobile industry established car testing facilities in Yakeshi. As part of the Electronic stability control (ESC)-development for new cars, special prototype cars are tested under winter conditions on frozen lakes and special snow-tracks. The first such test facilities were set up in the city by the German automobile supplier Robert Bosch GmbH whose development center for the Chinese car market is in Suzhou in Eastern China.

The city is connected by rail to Harbin and Hailar, and the nearest airport is in Hailar.

The original name for the city, Xuguit Banner, came from the Mongolian word for the area. Its name was changed to Yakeshi in 1983 when it was designated a county-level city.

Towns and villages

Tulihe, town of Yakeshi City

Climate

Transport
Yakeshi is located on the Harbin-Manzhouli Railway.

References

External links

Official website of Yakeshi Government
Post codes of Inner Mongolia (English)

Cities in Inner Mongolia
Hulunbuir